Khvalynsky (masculine), Khvalynskaya (feminine), or Khvalynskoye (neuter) may refer to:
Khvalynsky District, a district of Saratov Oblast, Russia
Khvalynskoye gas field, conventional gas condensate field in Kazakhstan